Antoine-Vincent Arnault (1 January 176616 September 1834) was a French playwright.

Life 
Arnault was born in Paris. His first play, Marius à Minturne (1791), immediately established his reputation. A year later he followed with a second republican tragedy, Lucrèce. Arnault left France during the Reign of Terror, but on his return, he was arrested by the revolutionary authorities.  He was freed through the intervention of Fabre d'Églantine and others. He was commissioned by Napoleon Bonaparte in 1797 with the organization of the French rule in the Ionian Islands, and was nominated to the Institute and made secretary general of the university. Arnault was faithful to his patron through his misfortunes, and after the Hundred Days remained in exile until 1819. Arnault died at Goderville.

Other plays of Arnault's are: Blanche et Moncassin, ou les Vénitiens (1798); and Germanicus (1816), the performance of which was the occasion of a disturbance in the parterre which threatened serious political complications. His tragedies are now less well known than his Fables (1813, 1815 and 1826), which are written in graceful verse. Arnault collaborated a Vie politique et militaire de Napoléon 1er (1822), and wrote some very interesting Souvenirs d'un sexagénaire (4 vols, 1833), which contain much out-of-the-way information about the history of the years previous to 1804. Arnault's Œuvres complètes (4 vols.) were published at the Hague and Paris in 1818-9, and again (8 vols.) at Paris in 1824.

Arnault's eldest son, Emilien Lucien Arnault (1787–1863), wrote several tragedies, the leading rôles in which were interpreted by Talma.

Works 
Theatre
1787: Les Frayeurs d'Arlequin, one-act comedy
1787: Robinson Cruzoe dans son île, one-act comedy
1791: Marius à Minturnes, three-act tragedy, Paris, Théâtre-Français, 19 May
1792: Lucrèce, five-act tragedy, in verse, Paris, Comédiens français ordinaires du roi, 4 May Text online
1793: Mélidore et Phrosine, drame lyrique in 3 acts, Paris, théâtre lyrique de la rue Favart, 17 germinal an II
1794: Quintius Cincinnatus, r=three-act tragedy, Paris, théâtre de la République, 11 nivôse an III Text online
1794: Horatius Coclès, acte lyrique, Paris, théâtre national de l'Opéra, ler décadi 30 pluviôse l'an deuxième Text online
1795: Oscar, fils d'Ossian, five-act tragedy, Paris, théâtre de la République, 14 prairial an IV Text online
1798: Blanche et Montcassin, ou Les Vénitiens, tragedy in 5 acts, Paris, Théâtre-Français, 25 vendémiaire an VII Text online
1802: Don Pèdre ou Le roi et le laboureur, tragedy in five acts, in vers, Paris, Théâtre-Français
1804: Scipion consul, drame héroïque in i act and in verse
1813: Cadet-Roussel esturgeon, folie-parade in 2 acts, mingled with vaudevilles, with Marc-Antoine Désaugiers
1814: La Rançon de Duguesclin, ou Les Mœurs du XIVe
1817: Germanicus, tragedy in 5 acts and in verse, Paris, Comédiens français ordinaires du roi, 22 March
1817–19 Œuvres complètes. Théâtre (4 volumes)
1825: Guillaume de Nassau, tragedy in 5 acts
1827: Le Proscrit, ou Les Guelfes et les Gibelins, tragedy in 5 acts and in verse, dedicated to the prompter of the Comédie-Française, Paris, Théâtre-Français, 9 July

Trivia
 Fables (1802)
 Œuvres complètes de Jacques Delille (5 volumes, 1817–19)
 Biographie nouvelle des contemporains ou Dictionnaire historique et raisonné de tous les hommes qui, depuis la Révolution française, ont acquis de la célébrité par leurs actions, leurs écrits, leurs erreurs ou leurs crimes, soit en France, soit dans les pays étrangers ; précédée d'un tableau par ordre chronologique des époques célèbres et des évènements remarquables, tant en France qu'à l'étranger, depuis 1787 jusqu'à ce jour, et d'une table alphabétique des assemblées législatives, à partir de l'assemblée constituante jusqu'aux dernières chambres des pairs et des députés (20 volumes en collaboration, 1820–25)

Biographie nouvelle des contemporains [1787-1820] 
  (A)
  (B-Bez)
  (Bi-By)
  (Cab-Col)
  (Coll-Dic)
  (Did – Ez)
  (F-Garra)
  (Garra-Gyl)
  (H-Jourdain)
  (J-Lang)
  (Lanne-Lenn)
  (Lew-Marl)
  (Marm-Monn)
  (Mono-Nap)
  (Napp-Pang)
  (Pani-Pop)
  (Por-Richel)
  (Richep-San)
  (San-Thou)
  (Thu-Z)
 Vie politique et militaire de Napoléon (2 volumes, 1822–26)
 Œuvres (8 volumes, 1824–27)
 Œuvres. Philosophie (3 volumes, 1827)
 Souvenirs d'un sexagénaire (1833). Réédition : Champion, Paris, 2003.
 Fables nouvelles (1834) Texte en ligne

References 

Attribution:

External links 

 Antoine-Vincent Arnault on data.bnf.fr

 
 
 

1766 births
1834 deaths
Writers from Paris
Expelled members of the Académie Française
Commission des Sciences et des Arts members
18th-century French poets
18th-century French male writers
19th-century French poets
18th-century French dramatists and playwrights
19th-century French dramatists and playwrights
Academic staff of École Polytechnique
French rule in the Ionian Islands (1797–1799)